Clavariopsis is a near-cosmopolitan genus of fungi belonging to the order Pleosporales, family unknown.

Species:

Clavariopsis aquatica 
Clavariopsis aquatica 
Clavariopsis azlanii 
Clavariopsis brachycladia 
Clavariopsis bulbosa 
Clavariopsis tenuis

References

Pleosporales
Taxa described in 1895
Dothideomycetes genera
Ascomycota enigmatic taxa